The Mexican Rugby Federation (FMR or FMRU) is the governing body for rugby union in Mexico. The FMRU organizes rugby in the country: a championship takes place at the highest level in the country, and in the same way organizes championship tournaments for youth, veterans and women.

History
The Englishman Walter Irvine founded the "Unión Mexicana de Rugby A.C." (UMR) in 1973 to organise and develop rugby union in Mexico. The UMR was the body directing Mexican rugby union for thirty years. 

The Federación Mexicana de Rugby was founded in October 2003.   In November 2003 the FMR was made an associate member of the International Rugby Board, now known as World Rugby. Mexico could thus take part in competitions organised by the supreme authority of rugby on a world level. Full membership followed in 2006.

At the beginning of 2007, the Mexican Olympic Committee recognized the FMR as an affiliate member.

National teams
The FMRU organizes several national teams that participate in international competitions:
 Mexico national rugby union team
 Mexico national rugby sevens team

See also
 Rugby union in Mexico
 Rugby Americas North Championship

External links 
  Federación Mexicana de Rugby - Official Site

Rugby union in Mexico
Rugby union governing bodies in North America
Rugby union